Alan Arthur Aronggear or Alan Aronggear (born 10 May 1990 in Merauke, Merauke Regency, Papua) is an Indonesian footballer. He currently plays for Perseru Serui at the Indonesia Super League.

References

External links
 

1990 births
Living people
People from Merauke Regency
Indonesian Christians
Indonesian footballers
Association football forwards
Perseru Serui players
Persidafon Dafonsoro players
Persiwa Wamena players
Sportspeople from Papua